Rubus tuerckheimii is an uncommon Central American species of brambles in the rose family. It has been found only in Guatemala.

Rubus tuerckheimii is a perennial with curved prickles, reclining on walls, rocks, or other vegetation. Leaves are compound with 3 leaflets.

References

External links

tuerckheimii
Flora of Guatemala
Plants described in 1913